Ross Browning is an Irish criminal and member of the Kinahan Organised Crime Group.

Early life
He was originally from Hardwicke Street flats in Dublin.

Assets seized
In February 2023 the High Court ruled that over one million euro of assets linked to Browning had been obtained as proceeedings of crime. The assets had been seized in 2018 and included motor vehicles, property in north County Dublin, luxury watches and jewellery. The Criminal Assets Bureau were authorised to seize the assets.

The properties were in Garristown, land in Rush and a house in Deanstown Road, Finglas.

Kinahan association
According to the judge, Browning had been attended the wedding of Daniel Kinahan in Dubai in 2017 and the wedding of Christopher Kinahan Jr in Spain in 2010. He has also been associated with Liam Byrne. The judge described Browning as a senior member of the Kinahan gang.

References

Kinahan Organised Crime Group
Irish criminals